Omer Saleh Al Mehannah (born December 31, 1959) is a football referee from the Asian state of Saudi Arabia. He is known for having officiated the football tournament in the 1996 Summer Olympics in Atlanta, United States.

References

External links
http://worldreferee.com/site/copy.php?linkID=1137&linkType=referee&contextType=stats

1959 births
Living people
Saudi Arabian football referees
Olympic football referees
AFC Asian Cup referees